In professional wrestling, a battle royal (sometimes battle royale; plural battles royal or battle royals) is a multi-competitor match type in which wrestlers are eliminated until one is left and declared the winner. Typical battles royal begin with a number of participants in the ring, who are then eliminated by going over the top rope and having both feet touch the venue floor.

Variations

Battlebowl

In a two-ring variation on a battle royal, the wrestlers start in one ring and try to throw wrestlers into the second ring, after which they can be eliminated by being thrown out of that ring. The last remaining wrestler in the first ring can rest until only one wrestler is left in the second ring, after which they fight in both rings until one is eliminated and a winner is declared, in similar fashion to a double elimination tournament. The two-version was held in World Championship Wrestling's 1991 Starrcade event. Subsequent Battlebowl matches occurred under normal battle royal rules.

Battle Zone
This format uses any number of wrestlers in a standard one-ring, over-the-top-rope elimination, but includes tables covered with barbed wire, thumbtacks, and light bulbs around the ring's perimeter, onto which losing wrestlers may be thrown.

Bunkhouse Stampede
The National Wrestling Alliance's (NWA) Bunkhouse Stampede involved wrestlers wearing what was described as "bunkhouse gear"—cowboy boots, jeans, T-shirts—instead of their normal wrestling tights, and not only allowed but encouraged the bringing of weapons. In 1988 the NWA named a pay-per-view after the Bunkhouse Stampede, headlined by a Bunkhouse Stampede match in a cage.

Dynamite Dozen Battle Royale

The Dynamite Dozen Battle Royale is utilized by All Elite Wrestling (AEW) and is held once a year as part of their weekly television program, Dynamite—the inaugural match took place in late November 2019, but since 2020, it has been held in December to coincide with the annual Winter Is Coming television special. It features 12 wrestlers competing in a standard battle royal, but ends when there are two wrestlers remaining. The co-winners then face each other in a singles match on the following week's episode for the AEW Dynamite Diamond Ring. The winner of the championship ring holds it until the following year's battle royal.

Four such matches have taken place so far. The first was on the November 20, 2019, episode of Dynamite, where Adam Page and MJF were the cowinners of the inaugural battle royal. MJF then defeated Page on the following week's episode of Dynamite to win the inaugural AEW Dynamite Diamond Ring. Wrestling veteran Diamond Dallas Page presented the ring to MJF. Then-AEW Executive Vice President and wrestler Cody Rhodes stated that the original ring was valued at US$42,000.

The second match occurred at the inaugural Winter Is Coming event, which aired as a special episode of Dynamite on December 2, 2020. MJF and Orange Cassidy were the co-winners. They faced each other on the following week's episode of Dynamite, where MJF defeated Cassidy to win the AEW Dynamite Diamond Ring for the second time.

The third match occurred on the December 8, 2021, episode of Dynamite, with MJF and Dante Martin cowinning the battle royal. The two faced each other at the second annual Winter Is Coming special episode of Dynamite the following week. For this third year, the ring's design was updated with a new net worth of $150,000. MJF defeated Martin by submission to win the AEW Dynamite Diamond Ring for the third time.

The fourth match took place on the December 7, 2022, episode of Dynamite, but with a slight change over the previous three iterations. Due to MJF being the only winner of the AEW Dynamite Diamond Ring, he was given a bye with there instead only being one winner for the 2022 Dynamite Dozen Battle Royale who would go on to face MJF for the ring at the third annual Winter Is Coming special episode of Dynamite the following week. Ricky Starks won the battle royale. Prior to the battle royale, Starks had also won a tournament to become the number one contender for the AEW World Championship, also held by MJF. It was in turn decided that at Winter Is Coming, MJF would defend both the AEW World Championship and the AEW Dynamite Diamond Ring against Starks in a Winner Takes All match. MJF defeated Starks to retain the championship and ring.

Fulfill Your Fantasy battle royal
A WWE women's battle royal with the addition of fetish outfits, such as french maid, lingerie, nurse and schoolgirl. Often the type of outfit is chosen by an audience poll.

Hardcore battle royal
A battle royal with hardcore rules (no disqualifications and no count-outs) involving several competitors in the ring at the same time. The match could last for either 15 or 20 minutes. Participants are not eliminated by being thrown out of the ring and both feet touching the floor. Pinning or forcing to submit the current Hardcore champion made that participant the interim champion. Whoever held the title at end of the time limit was declared the winner and official champion.

Last Blood battle royal
A Last Blood battle royal is essentially a multi-competitor First Blood match. The winner is the last wrestler in the match not bleeding.

Reverse battle royal
Generally used in Total Nonstop Action Wrestling, a reverse battle royal begins with wrestlers surrounding the ring instead of inside it. At the start of the match they battle for half of them to get into the ring, at which point a standard last person standing wins the battle royal.

Thunderbowl
A variation of Battlebowl involves 100 wrestlers split into 50 in two rings. The only way to be eliminated is to be thrown over the ropes. No matter how and where you hit, whether its apron, floor or barricade you are also eliminated. When 25 wrestlers are left in each ring stage 2 begins, where all 50 wrestlers get into one ring and there is no elimination. After a 5-minute period, the match turns into a Battle Royal where elimination is gained by throwing your opponent over the ropes to the floor. When five wrestlers remain, stage 3 begins. This 3rd stage then turns into a 5-way match where pinfall and submission eliminate an opponent. When two wrestlers are left, the match turns into a "last man standing" where KO is legal.

TNA Knockout Makeover Battle Royal
The match begins as a multi-woman over-the-top elimination battle royal. Participants are eliminated as they are thrown over the top rope and both feet land on the floor. When two competitors remain, they face each other in a ladder match, where the winner receives a TNA Knockout Championship match and the loser has her head shaved.

Women's battle royal
A women's battle royal may allow women to be eliminated by being thrown through or under the ropes as well as over the top rope, although WWE's first official women's Royal Rumble match in 2018 used the same rules as the men's version. But the rules were changed back in 2016 when the rule allowing women to be eliminated by being thrown under or through the ropes was eliminated.

World War 3

Created by World Championship Wrestling in 1995, the World War 3 battle royal had three rings and 60 competitors. 20 wrestlers started in each ring, where they wrestled under regular battle royal rules. When 30 competitors remained (except in 1997, where the number was 20), all competitors entered the center ring and continued under regular rules until only one was left standing.

Rumble rules battle royals
In this version - unlike traditional battles royal, where all wrestlers begin the match in the ring - only the first two competitors begin the match. The rest enter at timed intervals, according to numbers they draw, until the entire field has entered.

Former wrestler and longtime WWE official Pat Patterson is credited with inventing this variation.

Royal Rumble

WWE's Royal Rumble is the original battle royal to use this format. It begins with two wrestlers in the ring, with the remaining participants introduced one by one at a set time period, usually 90 seconds or two minutes. Elimination occurs in the normal way with the last person standing as the winner, after all participants (traditionally 30) have entered the ring.  There is both a men's and women's Royal Rumble match, with the winners getting a world championship match (in their respective divisions) at that year's WrestleMania, which is WWE's biggest annual show. Deviations from the traditional 30 wrestler field include the original 20-man Royal Rumble in 1988, the 40-man 2011 Royal Rumble and the 50-man Greatest Royal Rumble in 2018.

Honor Rumble
Ring of Honor (ROH) also periodically features the "Rumble" style of battle royal on their shows, billing it as the Honor Rumble.

New Japan Rumble
New Japan Pro-Wrestling's annual "Rumble" battle royal takes place on the pre-show of the first night of the two-night Wrestle Kingdom show on January 4. Participants enter at one-minute intervals and are eliminated via pinfall, submission, or by being thrown over the top rope. Typically leaning towards light comedy, the match includes past stars as surprise entrants. It is also known as the "New Japan Ranbo", the Japanese word ranbo meaning "to run riot".

Call Your Shot Gauntlet

The Call Your Shot Gauntlet (originally called Gauntlet for the Gold) is the "Rumble" style battle royal used by Impact Wrestling. In this version two wrestlers begin in the ring, with additional wrestlers entering on a set time period. Wrestlers are eliminated by being thrown over the top rope and to the floor until two wrestlers are left, at which point a standard singles match begins.  The prize for winning this match (which in recent years has become intergender and held at Impact's biggest annual show Bound For Glory) is getting a championship match at the time, the place, and for the title of the winner's choosing.

Square Go! 
Square Go! is Insane Championship Wrestling's (ICW) own hybrid of WWE's Royal Rumble and Money in the Bank matches, and is named for the Glaswegian term for a street fight. It features 30 competitors that compete in an over-the-top-rope battle royal, with the winner earning the Square Go! Briefcase. It has mostly the same rules as WWE's Royal Rumble, where two competitors draw the numbers 1 and 2 and the remaining participants enter the match one-by-one every 2 minutes. There are also five random numbers that allow those entrants to carry a weapon of their choice into the ring. As with battle royals, participants are eliminated when thrown over the top rope with both feet landing on the floor. The winner receives a briefcase that entitles them to a match for the ICW World Heavyweight Championship at any time and place of their choosing for up to one year, after which it becomes invalid (like WWE's Money in the Bank briefcase).

Battle Riot

Major League Wrestling's "Rumble" style battle royal. Participants enter at one minute intervals and are eliminated via pinfall, submission or by being thrown over the top rope.

Aztec Warfare 
Aztec Warfare is the Lucha Underground version of the "Rumble Rules" battle royal. Upwards to 20 participants enter every 90 seconds and elimination occurs by either pinfall or submission and has to take place inside the ring. There are no count-outs and no disqualifications.   As of April 2019, four Aztec Warfare matches have occurred—one in each season of Lucha Underground.

Casino Battle Royale

The Casino Battle Royale is utilized by All Elite Wrestling (AEW). It is a modified rumble rules battle royal that features 21 entrants. It begins with a group of five wrestlers, and every three minutes, another group of five wrestlers enters, while the 21st and final entrant enters alone. The wrestlers are grouped based on the suit they drew from a deck of cards—spades, diamonds, clubs, or hearts—and the order of when each group enters is based on a random draw of the cards. The 21st and final entrant is the wrestler who drew the joker. The winner receives a world championship match of their respective gender's division—either the AEW World Championship or the AEW Women's World Championship. The first Casino Battle Royale, which was a men's match, was held at Double or Nothing in May 2019.

A men's tag team variation of the match, called the Casino Tag Team Royale, was first utilized at Revolution in March 2021. Instead of being contested between 21 individual singles wrestlers, the match features 15 tag teams (for a total of 30 wrestlers). The rules in terms of entrants also differs. The order of entrants is based on a lottery. Two tag teams start the match, and every 90 seconds, a new team enters. Individual eliminations occur when a wrestler has gone over the top rope and both feet hit the floor; a team is eliminated when both members of the team have been ruled out of the match. The match ends when one wrestler or team is left. The winning tag team earns an AEW World Tag Team Championship match.

Royal Rampage
Used in All Elite Wrestling Rampage. It involves two rings and 20 competitors, 10 competitors in each ring. It starts with two wrestlers on each ring, a new wrestler enters in alternating ring at timed intervals every minute, the 2 final wrestlers from each ring collide in the final also in an over the top rope rules, with the winner becoming a number one contender for the AEW World Heavyweight Loosely resembles WCW's multi-ring, number one contender-seeking World War 3 matches which were held from 1996 to 1998.

Team variations
Team variations of battle royals consist of designated tag teams of wrestlers, usually two to a team. There are different types of such matches, and though most follow normal battle royal rules, teams may be eliminated when either one or both partners are eliminated from the ring. One notable version was the battle royal prior to WrestleMania XV, where each wrestler fought as a singles competitor, with the final two in the ring named joint winners, earning the right to challenge for the promotion's tag team championship later that night.

References

Further reading

 

de:Battle Royal
pt:Battle royal